Karen McPherson (born 1950 or 1951) is a Canadian retired Paralympic athlete. She won three medals in swimming events at the 1968 Summer Paralympics, held in Tel Aviv.

Early life 
McPherson became paraplegic in infancy, after surviving polio. She used arm crutches, leg braces, and a wheelchair. She was a student at Vancouver's Little Flower Academy, and attended Vancouver City College.

Swimming career 
McPherson competed in the first Pan American Wheelchair Games, held in Winnipeg in 1967, and won four gold medals in swimming events. She won three medals in the 1968 Summer Paralympics, held in Tel Aviv. She was the youngest British Columbian on the Canadian national team, and also competed in field events and table tennis. In 1969, she swam on a relay team with Gwen John, Hilda Binns, and Elaine Ell, and won seven medals at the Pan-American Wheelchair Games in Buenos Aires. In 1971 she competed in the Western Washington Wheelchair Games in Seattle, setting a record in the backstroke event. In 1973, she broke two national records at the B.C. Wheelchair Games. She held seven national Canadian records in 1974,  

McPherson was nominated for Junior Athlete of the Year by the Vancouver Junior Chamber of Commerce in 1969. She was active in the British Columbia Wheelchair Sports Association in its early years.

References

Living people
1950s births
Medalists at the 1968 Summer Paralympics
Paralympic medalists in swimming
Paralympic silver medalists for Canada
Paralympic bronze medalists for Canada
Swimmers at the 1968 Summer Paralympics
Paralympic swimmers of Canada
Canadian female backstroke swimmers
Canadian female breaststroke swimmers
20th-century Canadian women
21st-century Canadian women